Crompus is a genus of seed bugs in the family Lygaeidae. Crompus are terrestrial insects in the Ischnorhynchinae subfamily of seed bugs that are endemic to Australia. There are three described species in Crompus.

Species
These three species belong to the genus Crompus:
 Crompus nesiotes Ashlock, 1967
 Crompus oculatus Stål, 1874
 Crompus opacus Scudder, 1958

References

Further reading

 

Lygaeidae
Insects described in 1874
Insects of Australia
Taxa named by Carl Stål